Mosonmagyaróvár (Hungarian: Mosonmagyaróvár vasútállomás) is a railway station in Mosonmagyaróvár, Győr-Moson-Sopron County, Hungary. The station opened on 24 December 1855. It is located on the main line between Vienna and Budapest (Line 1 Budapest–Hegyeshalom railway). Train services are operated by MÁV START.

Train services
The station is served by the following services:

RailJet services Zürich - Innsbruck - Salzburg - Linz - St Pölten - Vienna - Győr - Budapest
RailJet services Munich - Salzburg - Linz - St Pölten - Vienna - Győr - Budapest
RailJet services Frankfurt - Stuttgart - Munich - Salzburg - Linz - St Pölten - Vienna - Győr - Budapest
EuroCity services Vienna - Győr - Budapest - Kiskunmajsa - Novi Sad - Belgrade
EuroCity services Vienna - Győr - Budapest - Debrecen - Nyíregyháza
Regional services  Bruck an der Leitha - Hegyeshalom - Győr
Local services Rajka - Hegyeshalom - Győr

References

External links

Railway stations opened in 1855
Railway stations in Hungary